Reșița is a city in western Romania and the capital of Caraș-Severin County. It is located in the Banat region. The city had a population of 73,282 in 2011.

Etymology 
The name of Reșița might come from the Latin recitia, meaning "cold spring", as the historian Nicolae Iorga once suggested, presuming that the Romans gave this name to Resita, from a water spring on the Doman valley. A much more plausibile version, according to Iorgu Iordan, would be that the name is actually coming from a Slavic word: people living in the neighbouring village of Carașova 15  km away, referring to this place, that in those days was a similar village to theirs, as being "u rečice" (at the creek). It can also be noted that almost all Slavic countries have places with the name of Rečice (pronounced Recițe in Romanian).

History

Historically, the town has its origins in the 15th century under the name of Rechyoka and Rechycha. Archaeological research found traces of habitation going back to the Neolithic, Dacian and Roman eras. It was mentioned in 1673 under the name of Reszinitza, whose citizens paid taxes to Timișoara, and by the years 1690–1700, it was mentioned as being part of the District of Bocșa together with other towns in the Bârzava Valley. The town was referenced to in the conscription acts of 1717 under the name of Retziza. On 3 July 1771, it became an important metal-manufacturing center in the region. The foundation of the industrial Reșița was laid with the establishment of factories near the villages of Reșița Română (Reschiza Kamerală or Oláh Resitza) and Reșița Montană (Eisenwerk Reschitza, Német(h) Reschitza or Resiczbánya). Reșița Montană was at first inhabited by Romanians,   and later, in 1776, 70 German families settled there. Between 1880 and 1941, Germans were the dominant population in the city, with as many of them as 12,096 residing here in 1941, as opposed to 9,453 Romanians, and 1861 Hungarians living here in the same year. Between the years 1910–1925, Reșița had the status of a rural area, and in 1925, it was declared a town thanks to its development to a powerful industrial location in modern Romania. In 1968, it became a municipality.

After 1989 Reșița lost most of its importance and its economy faced a drawback, along with the Romanian economy. The population also suffered a decrease, dropping from 110,000 in 1989 to 86,000 in 2006. After the fall of communism, the Reșița Steelworks (Combinatul Siderurgic Reșița, CSR) was bought by an American investor who brought the factory just one step away from bankruptcy. Today the steelworks are run by TMK Europe GmbH, a German subsidiary of the OAO TMK, Moscow, which has projects of modernization for the CSR.

The city

The city is situated along the Bârzava river, which meets the Doman river in the centre of town. Most of the urban area is concentrated along the Bârzava, with some development—mostly residential—in the surrounding hills.

It is made of three main areas, two former villages that were very close: Romanian Reșița ( or Olah Resitza) and Highland Reșița (Eisenwerk Reschitza or Nemet Reschitza); a new area, recently built, made of tower blocks on a wide opened meadow, called Bârzava's Meadow.

{| class="wikitable left" width="80%"
 |+ Neighbourhoods of Reșița
 ! scope="col" | Neighbourhoodname !! scope="col | Official name !! scope="col | Former name  !! scope="col | Occasional name  !! scope="col | Additional name
 |-
 ! scope="row" | New City
 | Bârzava's Meadow || New Reșița || North Reșița || Govândari
 |-
 | colspan=6 |

 |-
 ! scope="row"  | Downtown
 | City Centre || Romanian Reșița || South Reșița || N/A
 |-
 | colspan="6" |
{{align|left|rebuilt after the installment of the Socialist Romania in 1947, it contains the following zone areas: Centre – Civic center, rarely City centre
 Doman – The Doman's Valley
 Luncă – The Pomost's Meadow
 Moroasa made of Moroasa I and II
 Romanian Reșița
 The Clear Glade Hill or The Clear Glade Colony}}
 |-
 ! scope="row"  | Old City
 |  Commuter belt ( ||Highland Reșița ||Old Reșița ||N/A
 |-
 | colspan=6 |

 |-
|}

The Civic centre of the city has been partially renovated in 2006. An important point of attraction located in the City Centre is the impressive kinetic fountain designed by Constantin Lucaci, built in the communist era.

There are also important cultural points in Reșița that have been renewed in 2006, including the Concrete School (Școala de Beton), Downtown, and the Polyvalent Hall (Sala Polivalentă).

The Reșița Steam Locomotive Museum features Romania's first locomotive built in Romania at Reșița in 1872, and is located in the open-air museum in the  neighborhood.

An important iron and steel center, Reșița is the site of blast furnaces, iron foundries, and plants producing electrical appliances, chemicals and machinery (see Reșița works).

The city administers six villages: Câlnic (Kölnök), Cuptoare (Kuptore), Doman (Domány), Moniom (Monyó), Secu (Székul; Sekul) and Țerova (Krassócser).

Also, the city is a hub for leisure locations all around. Locations near Reșița include the ski resort at Semenic, Lake Gozna, Lake Secu, the Trei Ape Lake (Three Rivers Lake), Gărâna, Brebu, and Văliug.

Demographics

At the last census, from 2011, there were 65,509 people living within the city of Reșița, making it the 29th largest city in Romania. The ethnic makeup is as follows:

Religion

According to the 1880 Austro-Hungarian census the residents were:
6569 Roman Catholics
2129 Orthodox adherents
304 Lutherans
163 Eastern Catholics
126 Reformed adherents
72 Judaism adherents

Today there are many of the old churches in service and new ones:
Roman Catholic churches
Saint Mary of the Snows Church (Old City)
Trinity Sunday Church (Govândari)
Orthodox churches
New Joseph from Partoș Church (City Center)
Pentecost Church (Govândari)
Saints Peter and Paul Church (Govândari)
Saints Peter and Paul Church (Lend)
Saint Basil the Great Church (Moroasa)
Church of the Holy Archangels Michael and Gabriel (Moroasa)
Orthodox cathedral
Adormirea Maicii D-lui (Old City)
Schimbarea la Față (Govândari)
Lutheran church (Old City) – built in the 19th century
Reformed church (Old City)
Eastern Catholic church (Govândari)
Synagogue (Old City)

Climate
Reșița has a humid continental climate (Cfb in the Köppen climate classification).

Economy

Reșița has long been considered as the second-largest industrial center of Romania. It is an important center in manufacturing steel and vehicle manufacturing. C.S.R. (Combinatul Siderurgic Reșița) and U.C.M.R., the first Romanian factory (Uzina Constructoare de Mașini Reșița). The two are called as Reșița works and are the factories which sustained the city's life for more than 300 years. The first factories were built in 1771, during the reign of Maria Theresa. During the 19th century, the steelworks were known as StEG. After the end of World War I, when Banat became part of Romania, they changed their name again, this time to Uzinele și Domeniile Reșița or UDR (Reșița Works and Domains). Only later, under the Communist regime, did the UDR split to CSR and UCMR.

The economy of Reșița has faced a drawback since 1989, but began recovering as a result of increasing foreign and domestic investment, largely in industry.

 Industry: Automobile industry, Iron industry, texture industry, civilian constructions;
 Agriculture: 1% of the labour force of the city works in agriculture;
 Services: public alimentation, internal and international transport;
 Tourism: 2 tourism societies (Tourist Semenic SA and BIRTA SA).

Shopping
Reșița currently has 9 supermarkets of which three Carrefour supermarkets, two in the Govândari district (one of them was previously a Billa supermarket) and one in the Nera Shopping Center, three Lidl supermarkets, two Kaufland supermarkets, one near the road entrance from Bocșa and one in Lunca Bârzăvii and a Penny establishment also situated in Lunca Bârzăvii. The Shopping Center of Reșița is called Nera Shopping Center located in the Civic Centre. There are a variety of companies operating in Reșița, offering almost everything a normal consumer would need. There are some other shopping centres currently under development such as Reșița Shopping City located on the site of the old thermal plant, or the mall of the Mociur area.

Transport

Public transport

Reșița's public transport relays on 6 bus lines and was operated by the actually defunct Prescom company. It is now operated by TUR.

Buses

Reșița's bus fleet consists of about 25 buses running on 6 lines:1M/2: Marginea – Minda – Mol/Mopar/Molizilor4: Moroasa II – Lend/Baraj (dam of Secu Lake) – CET – Molizilor – Moroasa II8: Intim – Moniom – Intim9: Intim – Țerova – Intim10: Nera – Doman – Nera11: Piața Republicii – Minda – Cuptoare – Piața Republicii
Reșița's bus fleet was to be upgraded sometime during 2009.

Trams
A tram system, consisting of two lines, operated between 1988 and 2011 and is being restored.

The 2 tram lines were the Renk–Muncitoresc line (0), and the Renk–Stavila line (DP) which was basically an expansion of the Renk-Muncitoresc line, but there were only 3 trams on this line. The tram fleet consisted of about 28 trams. The last trams were GT8 and N models imported from Germany (Dortmund and Frankfurt), and completely replaced the former pre-89 trams in 2002. In 2008, the new mayor announced his intention to decommission all trams and replace them with modern buses complying with EU standards.

Reintroduction of trams was announced in 2016 and the modernization and expansion of the tram system began in 2019. The first phase involves 3.7 km double-track route with seven stops and a depot, the second phase will extend the system by 9.3 km and nine stops. In spring 2021, reopening was planned for December 2022, but was subsequently delayed, and as of October 2022 the completion of construction is forecast for December 2023, with reopening in 2024.

In 2017 it was announced that a new company, called Transport Urban Reșița (TUR), was created to manage the public transport in Reșița.

Trains

Road transport
Reșița features a main 4 lane road that connects the neighbourhood Stavila to the neighbourhood of Calnic. This main road passes through almost all important neighbourhoods in Reșița. The rest of the neighbourhoods in Reșița are accessible via 2 lane secondary roads or single-lane roads. Roads of Reșița are usually well maintained, especially the main road, but there are occasional pot-holes on secondary roads. The road signs are usually well placed and well maintained, and traffic is usually friendly and traffic jams are a myth. Accidents are very rare and almost never lethal. Externally Reșița is connected by national roads to Caransebeș (Continued to Bucharest) and respectively Timișoara. There are also 3 county roads connecting Reșița to Oravița, Năidaș and respectively Anina.

 Notable people 

 Cristian Chivu (1980–), football player
 Ciprian Foias (1933–2020), mathematician
 Christian Gabriel (1975–), chess grandmaster
 Flavius Koczi (1987–), artistic gymnast
 Werner Stöckl (1952–), handballer
  (1896–1978), ethnographer
 Francisc Vaștag (1969–), boxer

SportAssociation football CSM ReșițaHandball'''
 HC Adrian Petrea
 CSM Reșița

Twin towns – sister cities

Reșița is twinned with:

 Baskil, Turkey
 Bihać, Bosnia and Herzegovina
 Caen, France
 Kikinda, Serbia
 Loreto, Italy
 Marijampolė, Lithuania
 Pančevo, Serbia
 Pesaro, Italy
 Požarevac, Serbia
 Veliko Gradište, Serbia
 Vrgorac, Croatia
 Vršac, Serbia

References

External links

 Official site of Reșița (Romanian)
 Internet portal of Reșița (Romanian)

 
Cities in Romania
Capitals of Romanian counties
Localities in Romanian Banat
Mining communities in Romania
Monotowns in Romania
Place names of Slavic origin in Romania